Neluț Stelian Roșu (born 5 July 1993) is a Romanian professional footballer who plays as a central midfielder for Dinamo București.

Career
In January 2017, Roșu joined Viitorul Constanța where he contributed for the club's 2016–17 Liga I title, appearing 14 times for the team.

On July 4, 2017, Roșu moved abroad to sign with Bulgarian club Levski Sofia on a three-year deal for a reported fee of €100,000. He left the club by mutual consent at the end of 2017–18 season.

On 21 June 2018, Roșu signed with Astra Giurgiu.

Honours

Club
Viitorul Constanța
Liga I: 2016–17

Astra Giurgiu
Cupa României: Runner-up 2018–19

References

External links
 
 Profile at LevskiSofia.info

1993 births
Living people
Sportspeople from Cluj-Napoca
Romanian footballers
Romanian expatriate footballers
Expatriate footballers in Bulgaria
Romanian expatriate sportspeople in Bulgaria
Association football midfielders
CFR Cluj players
CS Luceafărul Oradea players
CS Concordia Chiajna players
FC Botoșani players
FC Viitorul Constanța players
PFC Levski Sofia players
FC Astra Giurgiu players
CS Gaz Metan Mediaș players
FC UTA Arad players
FC Voluntari players
FC Dinamo București players
Liga I players
Liga II players
First Professional Football League (Bulgaria) players